The Order, also known as the  (German for Brothers Keep Silent or Brothers' Silence), Silent Brotherhood or less commonly known as the Aryan Resistance Movement, was a  white supremacist terrorist organization active in the United States between September 1983 and December 1984. The group raised funds via armed robbery. Ten members were tried and convicted for racketeering, and two for their role in the 1984 murder of radio talk show host Alan Berg.

History
The Order was founded by Robert Jay Mathews in late September 1983 at his farm near Metaline, Washington. Reportedly, Mathews's farm was where the members trained. Mathews had previously formed the Sons of Liberty, an anti-communist militia mostly made up of Mormon survivalists, fundamentalists and associates of John Singer that had no connection to the historical American organization of the same name.

A fundamental goal of The Order was revolution against the American government, which its members, and those of other white supremacist groups, believed to be controlled by a cabal of Jews with internationalist and Jewish-racial loyalties, rather than loyalty to the American nation. The Order was named after, and partly modeled on, a fictional terrorist group in William Luther Pierce's novel The Turner Diaries. The Order's goals included the establishment of a homeland (now the Northwest Territorial Imperative) from which Jews and non-whites  would be barred. They often referred to the United States federal government as ZOG, an acronym for Zionist Occupied Government. Members of the Order included Randy Evans, Gary Yarborough, Bruce Pierce, Denver Parmenter, Frank DeSilva (also known as Frank Silva), Richard Scutari, David Lane, Randy Duey, and David Tate.

The Order drew up a hit list of enemies, and on June 18, 1984 radio talk show host Alan Berg was murdered in front of his home by Bruce Pierce, assisted by other members of The Order. Berg was number two on The Order's list.

In December 1984, authorities were able to track Mathews down to a house on Whidbey Island where he refused to surrender. During a shootout, the house was ignited by incendiary flares and became engulfed in flames, and Mathews was killed.  Mathews is considered a martyr by some white nationalists.

Funding 
Next, the group discussed how to fund actions of The Order, considering bidding on lumber-jacking and timber contracts, counterfeiting money, diaspora funding from overseas oil countries, and robberies. Though timber contracts were legal, counterfeiting money appealed to the ideals of the group in that it undermined the government by devaluing US currency. Robbery was first denied as an option due to its perceived sinful nature, until someone suggested they could rob pimps and drug dealers, which would raise money for the organization as well as set back street criminals in their businesses.

The organization won a bid on a timber trimming contract for a trail in the Salmo-Priest Wilderness. After five hours of grueling work, Matthews decided to call off the work and head home. Headed back to the trucks, David Lane muttered, "Well, we're going to have to be better thinkers than our fathers were, because we're sure not the men they were," while Matthews mentions that the pay off from the job "would not fund the right wing for a week anyway." The Order decided to try their hand at robberies, attempting to target pimps and drug dealers. After weeks of trailing black men in flashy cars, they realized they had no idea what a pimp or drug dealer looked like , and decided to switch to other crimes for funding.

The Order raised money through robbery. This began with the robbery of a pornographic video store, which netted them $369.10. Their later robberies were more effective, including a bank robbery, followed by a series of three armored car robberies. In the armored car robberies, they took a total of $4.1 million, including their final armored car robbery near Ukiah, California that netted them $3.8 million. The Order detonated a timed firebomb in a movie theater in Seattle (causing no deaths or injuries), in order to occupy the police during their second planned armored car robbery that took place the next day. Proceeds from these robberies were distributed to leaders of sympathetic organizations such as William Pierce (National Alliance) and Frazier Glenn Miller, Jr. (White Patriot Party).

The Order also ran a counterfeiting operation, but their bills were of poor quality, especially early on, and they led to Bruce Pierce being jailed early on, which later precipitated the group's downfall.

Downfall 
The Order was ultimately brought down when a member, Tom Martinez, approached the FBI and offered to turn informant. His role in the organisation had been to pass counterfeit money and he had been arrested on June 29, 1984, for passing counterfeit ten dollar bills to buy liquor. After he was released on his own recognizance Mathews convinced him to go underground and during this period Martinez learned that Mathews intended to kill the liquor store owner in order to prevent him from testifying. When he learned of Mathews' plan, Martinez approached the FBI and offered to turn informant.

Convictions
Ten members of The Order were tried and convicted under Racketeer Influenced and Corrupt Organizations Act (RICO) statutes with the help of the testimony of Frazier Glenn Miller, Jr., who testified against Order members in order to have his own sentence reduced. In a separate trial, three other members of The Order were tried and convicted of violating the civil rights of Alan Berg. No one has been charged in the murder of Berg. David Lane, the getaway driver for Berg's assailants, was sentenced to 190 consecutive years on the charges of racketeering, conspiracy, and violating Berg's civil rights. He died in prison in 2007. Order member Bruce Pierce was sentenced to 252 years in prison for his involvement in the Berg murder, and died of natural causes at the Allenwood Federal Correctional Complex on August 16, 2010 at the age of 56. Like Mathews, Lane and Pierce are regarded by many white-supremacists as heroes, political prisoners, and martyrs. In another trial, 14 men were charged with sedition, conspiracy, and civil rights violations. Thirteen of them were acquitted, and the judge dismissed the charges against the fourteenth man for lack of evidence.

A 2011 NPR report claimed that some of the people associated with this group were imprisoned in a highly restrictive Communication Management Unit. Richard Scutari, a member of the Order, was sentenced to a 60-year prison term in 1986, and was transferred to USP Marion CMU in July 2008.

Members

The Order II (Bruder Schweigen Strike Force II)
The Order II, which is also known as the Bruder Schweigen Strike Force II, was an attempt to perpetuate the activities of the first Order by David and Deborah Dorr, both of whom were previously members of the Aryan Nations, but their activities were confined to the state of Idaho. The group launched its first attack on March 6, 1986, when it sent a packaged bomb to Gary Solomon, a local Jewish businessman who owned the Solomon Trucking company in Hayden Lake, Idaho. No casualties resulted from the incident and it is unknown whether or not the explosion caused any property damage. The bomb was sent by David Dorr, the leader of Order II, a group that grew out of the original Order, which had previously collapsed. Order II (Bruder Schweigen Strike Force II) was also anti-government and anti-Semitic.

On August 7 of the same year, a 12-inch tube bomb exploded at Fred Bower's auto repair shop in Hayden, Idaho, causing about $2,000 in damage. No casualties resulted from the incident. The two perpetrators, David and Deborah Dorr, and an alleged third perpetrator, Edward W. Hawley, were members of the Bruder Schweigen Strike Force II.

On September 16, 1986, an explosion was reported in front of the house of a Catholic priest who lived in the city of Coeur d'Alene, in Idaho. The explosion caused no injuries. It only caused property damage. On September 29, 1986, his latest attack targeted a federal building, a telephone and luggage store, and a restaurant parking lot in Coeur d'Alene, without causing any injuries.

The ATF and local, state and federal security forces collected evidence from the scene of the blast and executed a federal search warrant at Dorr's residence three days later. Special agents discovered a shelter that housed fully automatic AR-15 assault rifles which was a violation of federal firearms laws, as well as 30 other firearms, large amounts of ammunition and counterfeit money. They also discovered bomb-making components that were used in the September 29 explosion, as well as in previous bombings. The militants received federal sentences which ranged from 6 to 30 years and state sentences which ranged from 5 years to life in prison.

See also
Aryan Republican Army
Elohim City, Oklahoma

Footnotes

Further reading and listening
Dees, Morris. Gathering Storm: America's Militia Threat. Harper Perennial, 1997. 

Söderman, Magnus; Holappa, Henrik. Unbroken Warrior: The Richard Scutari Letters. Nationellt Motstånd Förlag, 2011.

External links
FBI file on the Order

1983 establishments in Washington (state)
American bank robbers
Aryan Nations
Clandestine groups
Neo-fascist terrorism
Neo-Nazi organizations in the United States
Organizations based in North America designated as terrorist
Organizations established in 1983
White-supremacist organized crime groups in the United States
Religiously motivated violence in the United States
Terrorism in the United States
1984 disestablishments in Washington (state)